ChargePoint (formerly Coulomb Technologies) is an American electric vehicle infrastructure company based in Campbell, California. ChargePoint operates the largest online network of independently owned EV charging stations operating in 14 countries and makes the technology used in it.

History 

ChargePoint was founded in 2007 as Coulomb Technologies by Richard Lowenthal, Dave Baxter, Harjinder Bhade and Praveen Mandal.

In June 2017, ChargePoint took over 9,800 electric vehicle charging spots from GE. Prior to that point, ChargePoint managed 34,900 charging stations across Mexico, Australia, Canada, and the United States.

The current CEO and president as of 2018 is Pasquale Romano. On November 28, 2018, ChargePoint raised $240 million. At the time, ChargePoint maintained 57,000 charging spots. In 2019, VW's Electrify America and ChargePoint agreed to provide common access to their US customers.

Company reached 100,000 chargers in September 2019, while adding more than 2,000 charging locations per month 

ChargePoint electric vehicle charging spots are now at both of Disney's international-travel destinations in the U.S. ref></ref>

ChargePoint went public through a special-purpose acquisition company reverse merger in February 2021. In January 2023, ChargePoint, Mercedes-Benz, and MN8 Energy announced plans to add 2500 fast chargers at 400 charging hubs in the U.S., which will be available to all EVs.

Charging stations 
The company "designs, develops and manufactures hardware and software solutions" for electric vehicles at large. Its business model, according to the Silicon Valley Business Journal, involves selling "its hardware and software to property owners, build a searchable network of charging stations for drivers and maintain individual stations."

Current stations 

ChargePoint Home – This is a small home charger that won an Edison Award for new product innovation and human-centered design. It is available in 16A and 32A versions. ChargePoint Home Flex added 50A charging support.

CT4000 Family – The CT4000 is intended for property owners, businesses and municipalities providing for charging stations for their employees, customers, residents and fleets. It was the first to support power sharing along multiple ports.

CP4000 Family – Three phase Mennekes charging for Europe, up to 22 kW. Can share a single three phase 63A circuit or use two separate 32A circuits.

CPE 100 and CPE 200 – ChargePoint Express DC fast chargers offer fast charging for most DC-capable electric vehicles. With an embedded AC-to-DC converter, they directly charge the vehicle battery and can charge some EVs in less than 30 minutes. Express stations are particularly suitable for short dwell time parking, freeway corridor locations and quick turnaround fleet charging. They can also be installed in workplaces to complement CT4000 stations for employees who need a quick charge. Express 100 is 24 kW, Express 200 is 50 kW, and Express 250 is 62.5 kW. Express 100 is available in separate CCS and CHAdeMO models, while Express 200 is larger and has both ports. Express 200 is a charging design licensed from Tritium.

CPF25 Family – The CPF25 is designed for select fleet and multi-family applications. For fleets, CPF25 stations are suited for depot charging. For multi-family communities, CPF25 stations are intended for personal charging in assigned parking spots. CPF32 is a European Type 2 version (still limited to single phase 32A charging). The CPF50 added 50A charging support.

Chargepoint Express Plus Family – The liquid-cooled, modular 400 kW charging system called "Express Plus" was launched in January 2017 at CES in Las Vegas, Nevada, USA.

Obsolete stations 
CT1000 – NEMA 5-15 outlet only behind a door. First station ChargePoint created. Now rare with most being upgraded to CT2100.

CT1500 – 220 V 16 A outlets behind a door. Can be Schuko, BS 1363, or Australian outlets.

CT2000 – Single J1772.

CT2100 – J1772 and NEMA 5-20 charging on separate circuits.

CT2500 – Mennekes (IEC 62196) charging (single phase).

CT2020 family – Dual J1772 on separate circuits (no power sharing support).

CT500 – Small home charger (J1772), now replaced by ChargePoint Home.

CT3000 – 50 kW CHAdeMO fast charging

Gallery

See also 
 Charging station
 Plug-in vehicle
 Plug-in hybrid vehicle

References

External links 

 

Electric vehicle infrastructure developers
American companies established in 2007
Special-purpose acquisition companies
Electronics companies established in 2007
Companies listed on the New York Stock Exchange
Companies based in Campbell, California
Charging stations